The Santalales are an order of flowering plants with a cosmopolitan distribution, but heavily concentrated in tropical and subtropical regions. It derives its name from its type genus Santalum (sandalwood). Mistletoe is the common name for a number of parasitic plants within the order.

Overview 
Many of the members of the order are parasitic plants, mostly hemiparasites, able to produce sugars through photosynthesis, but tapping the stems or roots of other plants to obtain water and minerals; some (e.g. Arceuthobium) are obligate parasites, have low concentrations of chlorophyll within their shoots (1/5 to 1/10 of that found in their host's foliage), and derive the majority of their sustenance from their hosts' vascular tissues (water, micro- and macronutrients, and sucrose).

Most have seeds without testae (seed coats), which is unusual for flowering plants.

Classification 
The APG IV system of 2016 includes seven families. As in the earlier APG III system, it was accepted that Olacaceae sensu lato was paraphyletic but new family limits were not proposed as relationships were considered uncertain. , this seven-family division of the Santalales was explicitly accepted by the World Flora Online, and implicitly by Plants of the World Online, in that it accepted none of the extra families recognized by other sources. The seven families are:
 Balanophoraceae
 Loranthaceae
 Misodendraceae
 Olacaceae
 Opiliaceae
 Santalaceae
 Schoepfiaceae

When only these families are recognized, one possible phylogenetic relationship among them is shown below. Support for some of the nodes is weak, and at least two families, Olacaceae s.l. and Balanophoraceae s.l., are not monophyletic: 

A summary of the circumscription and phylogeny of the Santalales published in 2020 used 20 rather than seven families. Olacaceae s.l. was divided into seven families, Balanophoraceae s.l. was divided into two, and Santalaceae s.l. into seven. , the Angiosperm Phylogeny Website accepted the families resulting from the division of Olacaceae s.l. and Balanophoraceae s.l. but not those from the division of Santalaceae s.l.

Earlier systems
In the classification system of Dahlgren, the Santalales were in the superorder Santaliflorae (also called Santalanae). The Cronquist system (1981) used this circumscription:
 order Santalales
 family Medusandraceae – sole genus Medusandra now in family Peridiscaceae, order Saxifragales
 family Dipentodontaceae – now in order Huerteales in APG IV
 family Olacaceae
 family Opiliaceae
 family Santalaceae
 family Misodendraceae
 family Loranthaceae
 family Viscaceae - sunk into Santalaceae s.l. in the seven-family system
 family Eremolepidaceae - sunk into Santalaceae s.l. in the seven-family system
 family Balanophoraceae

References

 
 
 Santalales on the Parasitic Plant Connection web page
 NCBI Taxonomy Browser

 
Angiosperm orders